Shatrunjay Gaekwad is an Indian cricketer. He played for Baroda and the Kolkata Knight Riders.

Early life 
He was born in 1983. His father Anshuman Gaekwad, and grandfather Datta Gaekwad were also cricketers.

Career 
He made his first class debut for Baroda in 2003.

References 

Indian cricketers
1983 births
Living people
Baroda cricketers